Hannah Hallowell Clothier Hull (July 21, 1872 – July 4, 1958) was an American clubwoman, feminist, and pacifist, one of the founders and leaders of the Women's Peace Party and the Women's International League for Peace and Freedom.

Early life
Hannah Hallowell Clothier was born in Wynnewood, Pennsylvania, to Quaker parents Isaac Hallowell Clothier and Mary Clapp Jackson Clothier. Her father was co-founder of the Strawbridge & Clothier department stores. She graduated from Swarthmore College in 1891.  Her brother William Clothier was an accomplished tennis player who reached the singles final of the US Open (tennis) three times, winning in 1906.

Career

Hannah Clothier Hull volunteered at the College Settlement House in Philadelphia after she graduated from Swarthmore. She attended the Second Hague Conference for International Peace in 1907. She was chair of the Women's Peace Party in Pennsylvania from 1914 to 1919, through World War I. In 1922 she attended the International Conference of Women held at the Hague. From 1928 until 1947, Hannah Clothier Hull was on the board of the American Friends Service Committee. In 1932 Hull was a delegate to League of Nations Disarmament Conference. She was an officer of the American branch of the Women's International League for Peace and Freedom from 1924 until 1939, and then held the title honorary president until her death in 1958.

She was president of the Swarthmore Woman's Club, and chaired the suffrage committee of the State Federation of Pennsylvania Women. She was on the board of directors at Pendle Hill, a Quaker retreat center in Wallingford, Pennsylvania.

Personal life
Hannah Clothier married fellow Quaker William Isaac Hull, a political science professor at Swarthmore College in 1898. They had two daughters, Mary and Elizabeth. She was widowed in 1939, and died in 1958, after a heart attack at her home in Swarthmore, aged 85 years. She is buried in the family plot at West Laurel Hill Cemetery (Summit Section) in Bala Cynwyd, Pennsylvania.  Her papers are archived in the Swarthmore College Peace Collection.

See also
List of peace activists

References

External links
"Document 13: Hannah Clothier Hull to Dorothy Detzer, February 21, 1928, The Records of the Women’s International League for Peace and Freedom, U.S. Section, Swarthmore College Peace Collection (Scholarly Resources Microfilm, reel 47, #876), by Hannah Hallowell Clothier Hull," in "How Did Women Peace Activists respond to 'Red Scare' Attacks during the 1920s?" by Kathryn Kish Sklar and Helen Baker (Binghamton, NY: State University of New York at Binghamton, 1998). Retrieved online via Alexander Street, Bethesda, Maryland, July 11, 2021.
"Hannah Clothier Hull Papers, 1889-1958" (Collection: DG016), in "Swarthmore College Peace Collection." Swarthmore, Pennsylvania: Swarthmore College, retrieved online July 10, 2021.
"Hannah Clothier Hull, Isaac H. Clothier, Dr. William I. Hull portraits, undated", in "Caroline Katzenstein papers (Am.8996)." Philadelphia, Pennsylvania: Historical Society of Pennsylvania, retrieved online July 11, 2021.

1872 births
1958 deaths
Clubwomen
Quakers from Pennsylvania
American suffragists
American pacifists
American women in World War I
People from Montgomery County, Pennsylvania
Swarthmore College alumni
Women's International League for Peace and Freedom people
American Quakers
American feminists
Quaker feminists
20th-century American people
Burials in Pennsylvania